Montego Bay United Football Club is a Jamaican football club based in Montego Bay.

History
Founded as Beacon in 1972, the club were renamed Seba United after a few years and has won the Jamaica National Premier League in 1987 and 1997, the most famous one was in the 1996/97 season when they were docked twenty points but still found a way to the lift the title. The club used to play their home games at Jarrett Park, which can hold a capacity of up to 4,000, and is located in Montego Bay.

Seba were relegated from the Premier League after the 2007/08 season for the first time in their storied history and played in the Western Confederation Super League, before returning to Jamaica's top level for the 2011/12 season after winning the promotion play-offs. Successful Peruvian coach Danilo Barriga however left the club just a few weeks before the end of the season.

In July 2011, the franchise was acquired by Orville Powell and renamed and rebranded as Montego Bay United, despite earlier claims by former chairman Bruce Gaynor it would not ever happen. They now play their home games at Montego Bay Sports Complex, Montego Bay.

In 2013 they moved to the WespoW Park stadium in the Tucker area of Montego Bay.
They are the current premier league champions, having won the 2015–2016 season.

In July 2016 Montego Bay assigned Serbian coach Slaviša Božičić as their new manager.

In August 2019 Somali coach Mohamed Yusuf was appointed as the manager.

In January 2022 Ricky Hill became the manager.

Achievements 

Jamaica National Premier League: 4
1987, 1997, 2014, 2016

JFF Champions Cup: 1
1992

Western Confederation Super League: 1
2011

CFU Club Championship: 0
Runner-up (1): 1997
Third Place (1) : 2015

References

External links
 Team profile at GolocalJamaica (archived)
 Official website (archived)

Football clubs in Jamaica
Association football clubs established in 1972
1972 establishments in Jamaica